White Cross or Whitecross may refer to:

Places
Bewsey and Whitecross, a ward in Warrington, England
Whitecross (Blisland), a location near Blisland, Cornwall
 White Cross, Cornwall, a village near St Columb Major, Cornwall
 POW Camp 115, Whitecross, St Columb Major
Whitecross, County Armagh, a village in the Newry and Mourne District Council area of Northern Ireland
Whitecross, County Meath, part of Julianstown/Whitecross, Ireland
Whitecross (Crowlas), a hamlet near Crowlas, Cornwall
Whitecross, Falkirk, a village in Scotland
Whitecross Hereford High School, in Hereford, England
White Cross, Herefordshire, a place in Herefordshire
White Cross–Huntley Hall, a historic home in Charlottesville, Virginia
Whitecross (Lanteglos), a hamlet near Lanteglos Highway, Cornwall
White Cross, Richmond, a pub in Richmond, London
White Cross, Somerset, a United Kingdom location
Whitecross (St Breock), a hamlet near St Breock, Cornwall
Whitecross Street, London
White Cross, Wiltshire, a United Kingdom location
Athcarne Cross or White Cross, a stone wayside cross in Ireland

Persons with the surname
Andrew Whitecross (born 1963), Australian politician for the Labor Party
Brendan Whitecross (born 1990), Australian rules football player for Hawthorn
Greg Whitecross (born 1961), Australian tennis player
Mat Whitecross (born 1977), film director, award winner at the 56th Berlin International Film Festival

Other uses
Irish White Cross, a relief organisation, active 1921–1928
La Cruz Blanca (The Neutral White Cross), a Mexican volunteer nursing service founded in 1911
Whitecross (band), an American Christian metal band
 Whitecross (album), 1987 Whitecross album
White Cross (chemical warfare), a tear gas agent
 The first step of the CFOP method
 White cross (military symbol), military vehicle marking used by the Wehrmacht in 1939, the Royal Hungarian Army until 1945, and the Ukrainian Military Forces in 2022